Polyonyx gibbesi, the eastern tube crab, is a species of porcelain crab in the family Porcellanidae. It is found in the western Atlantic Ocean.

References

Further reading

 

Anomura
Crustaceans of the Atlantic Ocean
Crustaceans described in 1956
Articles created by Qbugbot